Dysschema unifascia is a moth of the family Erebidae. It was described by Hering in 1925. It is found in Paraguay.

References

Dysschema
Moths described in 1925